Malviya Nagar Assembly constituency may refer to 

 Malviya Nagar, Delhi Assembly constituency
 Malviya Nagar, Rajasthan Assembly constituency